Naomichi (written: , ,  or ) is a masculine Japanese given name. Notable people with the name include:

, Japanese baseball player
, Japanese footballer
, Japanese professional wrestler
, Japanese golfer
, Japanese politician
, Japanese footballer

Fictional characters
, a character in the manga series Gender-Swap at the Delinquent Academy
Naomichi Kurumada, a character from the Japanese horror adventure game Kimi ga Shine -Tasūketsu Death Game-

Japanese masculine given names